Al-Sadda Sport Club is an Iraqi football team based in Babil, that plays in Iraq Division Two.

Managerial history
  Maitham Dael-Haq
 Ali Ubayyes
 Hussam Nima

See also 
 2001–02 Iraq FA Cup
 2002–03 Iraq FA Cup
 2020–21 Iraq FA Cup

References

External links
 Al-Sadda SC on Goalzz.com
 Iraq Clubs- Foundation Dates

1992 establishments in Iraq
Association football clubs established in 1992
Football clubs in Babil